Pawson may refer to:

Anthony Pawson (born 1952), British-born Canadian molecular biologist
Craig Pawson (born 1979), English football referee
David Pawson (born 1930), British Bible teacher
Francis Pawson (born 1861), English footballer
Guy Pawson (1888–1986), English cricketer
Iris Veronica Pawson (1887–1982), British novelist and non-fiction writer
John Pawson (born 1949), British minimalist designer
Les Pawson (1905–1992), American marathon runner
Ray Pawson, British sociologist
Tony Pawson (cricketer) (1921–2012), English cricketer and cricket writer, son of Guy

See also
Mount Pawson, southeast of Mohn Peaks, on the east coast of Palmer Land
Pawson Peak, solitary peak of irregular conical shape, west-northwest of Sphinx Hill, Admiralty Bay, King George Island
Porsön
Porson (typeface)
Possum (disambiguation)